The 1990 Skate Canada International was held in Lethbridge, Alberta on October 25–28. Medals were awarded in the disciplines of men's singles, ladies' singles, pair skating, ice dancing, men's interpretive, ladies' interpretive, and four skating.

Results

Men's singles

Ladies' singles

Pairs

Ice dancing

Men's interpretive

Ladies' interpretive

Fours

References

Skate Canada International, 1990
Skate Canada International
1990 in Canadian sports 
1990 in Alberta